Mirsara (also Romanized as Mīrsarā and Mīrserā; also known as Aḩmad Sarā and Aḩmad Sar Gūrāb) is a village in Chubar Rural District, Ahmadsargurab District, Shaft County, Gilan Province, Iran. At the 2006 census, its population was 549, in 157 families.

References 

Populated places in Shaft County